Mike Schultz (born August 19, 1950) is an American politician from Utah. He is a Republican member of the Utah State House, representing the state's 12th house district. He currently serves as the Majority leader in the House, a position he has held since November 9, 2021 when his predecessor in that office, Francis Gibson abruptly resigned from the legislature.

Early life and career
A lifelong resident of Hooper, Roy and West Haven, Schultz grew up working on his grandfather's cattle farm. An entrepreneur, he went on to obtain his general contractor's license and started building homes at age 20. He now is a real estate developer and president of Castle Creek Homes. He worked with his good friend Michael Hall.

Political career
Schultz was first elected to the Utah House of Representatives in 2014 and began serving January 1, 2015. He is currently serving as House Majority Leader.

Rep. Schultz currently serves on the Business, Economic Development, and Labor Appropriations Subcommittee, Executive Appropriations Committee, House Education Committee, House Law Enforcement and Criminal Justice Committee, House Legislative Expense Oversight Committee, House Natural Resources, Agriculture, and Environment Committee, Legislative Audit Subcommittee, Legislative Audit Subcommittee, Subcommittee on Oversight.

Current legislation

Controversial legislation 
In 2018 Schultz co-sponsored SB136 with Wayne Harper which was signed into law. Among other provisions, SB136 includes an additional annual registration fee of up to $120 on clean air vehicles. The additional fees were opposed by air quality advocates such as the nonprofits Breathe Utah, and Utah Clean Energy which has stated the fees are misguided. Clean air advocates have voiced concerns that the additional fees will slow electric vehicle adoption and promote poorer air quality in Utah. There are an estimated 1,000–2,000 deaths in Utah annually due to poor air quality, and emissions from gasoline and diesel powered vehicles, are the primary cause of pollution.

Elections
 2014: Schultz challenged incumbent Richard Greenwood for the Republican nomination, eventually winning when Greenwood dropped out. He faced Democrat Joseph Marrero in the general election, winning with 4,118 votes (75.9%) to Marrero's 1,308 votes (24.1%).

References

Republican Party members of the Utah House of Representatives
University of Phoenix alumni
Weber State University alumni
American Latter Day Saints
1950 births
Living people
21st-century American politicians